Densuano, also called Water Works, is a small village in Koforidua in the Eastern Region of Ghana. Densuano is a village with not more than 2,000 inhabitants. The village boasts of the Densu dam which used to serve the Koforidua township and its neighboring environment. For several years, this dam supplied water to a filtering station at Ada for further treatment.

Etymology 

The word Densu is a name of a river which source from the Eastern Region. It passes through Koforidua at this small village. The Densu river is believed to be a god which is worshiped by many. At times, in serious issues, people rely on this river for curses and other rituals. In certain instances, sacrifice is delivered to the river for a purpose, such for peace, rainfall, etc.

In Twi, the ending part of the word, Ano literally means mouth, or beginning or start of. The village therefore was called densuano simply meaning the beginning of Densu. However, the village does not source the Densu river. Other inhabitants live across the dam, making the dam form a division. The name of the area of those living across the river is Densuagya, meaning outskirt of Densu.

Entertainment 

Even though a little village with not much scientific gadgets and electronic devices, the village enjoys real entertainment. The village has a football team that engages in tournaments that, even though fetches little, keeps the inhabitant a part of the worldwide football community in their little way.
The village also boast of a little video center that shows new movie releases in the nation. Many, old and young, throng this center almost daily to have a fair share of the nice video in the country. Just near to this small cinema is a video game center that houses brand names like Xbox 360 and PS games. The game center is always occupied with, both formal and non-formal students who battle it out with their friends to see who wins football leagues, car racing, and even wrestling games.

Occupation
Inhabitants of this village are basically palm wine tappers, fishermen and farmers. Abɛ, which in English means, Palm Tree, is one of the favorite plants that is highly respected in the area simply because of its ability to produce palm wine which can further be processed to get Akpɛteshie, a strong dry gin.
Many of the youth in the area also are laborers in masonry. During the day time, the village appears empty. However, on getting into the night, many people move to the roadsides

Administration 

The Assembly Woman of Densuano, called Esther Gyeki, won assembly level elections in the year 2011 and was sworn in 2012. Apart from the Assembly Woman who represents Densuano in legal and as a government rep, there are other leaders, of which the most recognized of all is the Odikurow, who is somehow the local chief.

Future Plans
The road leading to Densuano is planned to link Koforidua to Suhum through to Accra. The dam in the village which was constructed some decades ago will be renovated to allow the movement on it. This alternative is being worked on since the bridge at Suhum is dilapidated and poses risk of harming motorists and pedestrians.

On map, Densuano has an airport demarcated area and some reserved hotel lands.

Populated places in the Eastern Region (Ghana)